Frauenthal House may refer to:

Frauenthal House (Conway, Arkansas), listed on the National Register of Historic Places (NRHP)
Clarence Frauenthal House, Heber Spring, Arkansas, NRHP-listed, also known as Frauenthal House
Frauenthal House (Little Rock, Arkansas), NRHP-listed

See also
Frauenthal & Schwarz Building, Conway, Arkansas, NRHP-listed